Mackenzie Kiritome is the owner of a trading company, who became a Tuvaluan politician when he was elected to represent Nui in the 2015 Tuvaluan general election. He was re-elected in the 2019 general election.

Mackenzie Kiritome was born in Kiribati and now lives in Tuvalu. He is the owner of Mackenzie Trading Limited, which since 2008, has operated small retail outlets in the outer islands to sell merchandise. In 2010 the business employed 40 people. Mackenzie Trading Limited competes with the Co-operative Society.

References

Members of the Parliament of Tuvalu
People from Nui (atoll)
Living people
Year of birth missing (living people)